Robert Gordon Evans (20 August 1899 – 2 August 1981) was an English first-class cricketer and educator.

Born at Great Barton in Suffolk, Evans was educated at King Edward VI School in Bury St Edmunds. He served in the latter part of World War I with the Suffolk Regiment as a second lieutenant. After the war he went up to Peterhouse, Cambridge in March 1919. While studying at Cambridge he made his debut in first-class cricket for Cambridge University against the Marylebone Cricket Club at Lord's in 1920. He made eleven further first-class appearances for Cambridge in 1921. Across these matches he scored a total of 197 runs at an average of 28.14, with a highest score of 46 not out. With his right-arm fast-medium bowling he took 45 wickets a bowling average of 22.77, with best innings figures of 6/45, one of three five wicket hauls he took. Evans gained a blue in 1921. He also played two first-class matches for the Free Foresters in 1922 and 1923.

After graduating from Peterhouse, Evans became a teacher. He worked as an assistant master at Dulwich College from 1921–1924, before taking up the same role at Wellington College from 1924. He played minor counties cricket for Berkshire in 1935 and 1936, making eight appearances in the Minor Counties Championship. He later taught at The Prebendal School in Chichester, and retired to nearby Sidlesham, where he died in August 1981.

References

External links

1899 births
1981 deaths
People from the Borough of St Edmundsbury
People educated at King Edward VI School, Bury St Edmunds
British Army personnel of World War I
Suffolk Regiment officers
Alumni of Peterhouse, Cambridge
English cricketers
Cambridge University cricketers
Free Foresters cricketers
Berkshire cricketers
Schoolteachers from Suffolk
Masters of Dulwich College
Masters of Wellington College, Berkshire
People from Sidlesham